The 1948–49 Kansas Jayhawks men's basketball team represented the University of Kansas during the 1948–49 college men's basketball season.

Roster
Clinton Bull
Guy Mabry
Jerry Waugh
Claude Houchin
William Sapp
Dale Engel
Charles Penny
Lynwood Smith
Maurice Martin
Gene Petersen
Harold England
David Dennis

Schedule

References

Kansas Jayhawks men's basketball seasons
Kansas
Kansas
Kansas